Fioriniina is a subtribe of armored scale insects.

Genera
Adiscofiorinia
Africaspis
Bayokaspis
Chlidaspis
Crockeraspis
Crypthemichionaspis
Epifiorinia
Exuviaspis
Fiorinia
Fraseraspis
Heimaspis
Ichthyaspis
Kulatinganaspis
Mayonia
Parafiorinia
Pseudaulacaspis
Rutherfordia
Singapuraspis
Sinistraspis
Thysanofiorinia
Trullifiorinia
Tulefiorinia

References

Diaspidini